Cordycepin, or 3'-deoxyadenosine, is a derivative of the nucleoside adenosine, differing from the latter by the replacement of the hydroxy group in the 3' position with a hydrogen.  It was initially extracted from the fungus Cordyceps militaris, but can now be produced synthetically. It is also found in other Cordyceps species as well as Ophiocordyceps sinensis.

Because cordycepin is similar to adenosine, some enzymes cannot discriminate between the two. It can therefore participate in certain biochemical reactions (for example, 3-dA can trigger the premature termination of mRNA synthesis). By acting as an adenosine analog, cordycepin was found to be the most potent molecular circadian clock resetter out of several screened compounds.

Cordycepin has displayed cytotoxicity against some leukemic cell lines in vitro.

Cordycepin has been found to produce rapid, robust imipramine-like antidepressant effects in animal models of depression, and these effects, similarly to those of imipramine, are dependent on enhancement of AMPA receptor signaling.

See also
 2'-Deoxyadenosine

References

Alkaloids
Alkaloids found in fungi
Antidepressants
Nucleosides